Cristina Rivellini (born 27 February 1970 in Monza, Italy) is a former Italian basketball player.

References

1970 births
Living people
Italian women's basketball players
Sportspeople from Monza